William Frederick Knight (December 6, 1933 – November 8, 2022), sometimes credited as William Knight, William Frederick, or Frederick Knight, was an American voice actor who lent his voice to the English dubs of anime and video games. He was often cast in the role of a wise old man, such as in Ghost in the Shell (as Daisuke Aramaki), The Big O (as Gordon Rosewater), Paranoia Agent (as the old man), and Eureka Seven (as Kuzemi, one of the three Sages).

Knight died in North Hollywood, California on November 8, 2022, at the age of 88.

Voice roles

Anime

 Amazing Nurse Nanako – General, Griffith
 Carried by the Wind: Tsukikage Ran – Denkichi's Master
 Cowboy Bebop – Old Man (Session 2: "Stray Dog Strut")
 DearS – Grandfather
 El Hazard – The Magnificent World – Dr. Schtalubaugh
 El Hazard 2 – The Magnificent World – Dr. Schtalubaugh
 El Hazard: The Alternative World – Dr. Schtalubaugh
 El Hazard: The Wanderers – Dr. Schtalubaugh, Captain of the Guard
 Ergo Proxy – J.J. (Ep. 11)
 Eureka Seven – Kuzemi
 Fake – Leonard Henry
 Freedom Project – Alan
 Gad Guard – Gary
 Gankutsuou: The Count of Monte Cristo – Luigi Vampa
 Ghost in the Shell: SAC 2045 – Daisuke Aramaki
 Ghost in the Shell: Stand Alone Complex – Daisuke Aramaki
 Ghost in the Shell: Stand Alone Complex 2nd GIG – Daisuke Aramaki
 Gungrave – Dr. Tokioka, Butler Tokioka
 GUNxSWORD – Carlos (Eps. 3, 26)
 Haibane Renmei – Watchmaker
 Heat Guy J – Grandpa
 Hellsing – Father Rinaldo
 Hellsing Ultimate – Father (Ep. 3)
 Hibakusha – Colonel Paul Tibbets
 Ikki Tousen – Choko
 Immortal Grand Prix – Ichi
 JoJo's Bizarre Adventure: Stone Ocean – Kenzou
 Kamichu! – Chairman of God Association (Ep. 7)
 Kurokami – Keita's grandfather
 L/R: Licensed by Royalty – Lord Miralio, Professor Freud
 Mahoromatic: Something More Beautiful – Jils
 Mars Daybreak – Doze
 Mermaid Forest – Toba Islander
 Mezzo Forte – Emoto
 Naruto – Hyuga Elder Sukeza (Ep. 153)
 Naruto Shippuden – Danzō Shimura
 New Getter Robo – Bonze
 NieA 7 – Butcher, Newscaster, Newspaper Man, Old Alien
 Nura: Rise of the Yokai Clan – Nurarihyon
 Outlaw Star – Ctarl-Ctarl Governor
 Overman King Gainer – Gach
 Paranoia Agent – Old Man
 Planetes – Father-In-Law
 R.O.D -The TV- – Irving (Ep. 5), Shop Owner A, Teacher (Ep. 6)
 Rumic Theater – Old Man, Pops
 Samurai Champloo – Daigoro
 Spirit of Wonder – Cooper
 Spirit of Wonder Scientific Boys Club – Cooper
 Starship Girl Yamamoto Yohko II – Swift
 Strawberry Eggs – Tofu Kuji
 Street Fighter II V – Master Yo Sen-ko (Animaze dub)
 Texhnolyze – Old Man 1, Tsujinaka
 The Adventures of Mini-Goddess – Crawl Space Boss, Narrator
 The Big O – Gordon Rosewater
 The Melody of Oblivion – Old Man Tsunagi
 The Third: The Girl with the Blue Eye – Dr. Nor
 The Twelve Kingdoms – Genkai
 Tokko – Taishi
 Trigun – Old Man (Ep. 5)
 Wolf's Rain – Old Wolf (Ep. 5)
 Yashahime: Princess Half-Demon – Grandpa

Films

 Akira – Miyako (Pioneer/Animaze dub)
 Appleseed – Elder
 Cowboy Bebop: The Movie – Van Dann
 Ghost in the Shell – Section 9 Department Chief Aramaki
 Ghost in the Shell: Stand Alone Complex: Solid State Society – Daisuke Aramaki
 Ghost in the Shell 2: Innocence – Daisuke Aramaki
 Metropolis – Notarlin
 Street Fighter Alpha – Monk
 Mega Monster Battle: Ultra Galaxy – Shin Hayata/Ultraman
 Ultraman Zero: The Revenge of Belial – Ultraman
 Ultraman Saga – Shin Hayata/Ultraman

Video games

 Beat Down: Fists of Vengeance - Melvin
 The Darkness – Frank Rottenberg
 Defiance – Varus Soleptor
 Ghost in the Shell – Daisuke Aramaki
 Ghost in the Shell: Stand Alone Complex – Daisuke Aramaki
 Naruto series – Danzo Shimura
 Prince of Persia: The Sands of Time – Sultan of Azad
 Sengoku Basara: Samurai Heroes – Hojo Ujimasa
 WildStar – Dorian Walker, Pell, Torax
 World of Final Fantasy'' – Adamantoise

References

External links

1933 births
2022 deaths
Place of birth missing
20th-century American male actors
21st-century American male actors
American male video game actors
American male voice actors